The 1998 Paris–Tours was the 92nd edition of the Paris–Tours cycle race and was held on 4 October 1998. The race started in Saint-Arnoult-en-Yvelines and finished in Tours. The race was won by Jacky Durand of the Casino team.

General classification

References

1998 in French sport
1998
Paris-Tours
1998 in road cycling
October 1998 sports events in Europe